United Utilities Group plc (UU), the United Kingdom's largest listed water company, was founded in 1995 as a result of the merger of North West Water and NORWEB. The group manages the regulated water and waste water network in North West England, which includes Cumbria, Greater Manchester, Lancashire, Merseyside, most of Cheshire and a small area of Derbyshire, which have a combined population of more than seven million.

The United Utilities Group was the electricity distribution network operator for the North West until 2010, when its electricity subsidiary was sold to Electricity North West. United Utilities' headquarters are in Warrington, England, and the company has more than 5,000 direct employees. Its shares are listed on the London Stock Exchange and it is a constituent the FTSE 100 Index.

North West England is the wettest region in England, and water hardness across the region is soft to very soft.

History
In 1989 the North West Water Authority, which was responsible for the provision of water to the North West of England, was privatised and became North West Water Group plc. In 1995, the company acquired NORWEB plc, the then regional electricity distributor and supplier, and on 1 April 1996 changed its name to United Utilities plc.

In January 1998, United Utilities listed on the New York Stock Exchange, but delisted its shares in May 2007. In 2000, the North West Water and NORWEB branding was phased out in favour of United Utilities, the rebranding was completed by the end of 2001. The company sold some of the businesses it had acquired, its telecoms business, Your Communications was sold in February 2006, and Vertex in March 2007.

In December 2007, United Utilities sold its electricity distribution network assets to North West Electricity Networks (Jersey) Limited, a joint venture between funds run by Colonial First State and JPMorgan Chase. Electricity North West became the licensed Distribution Network Operator for the north west of England as a result.

United Utilities operated and maintained the regional electricity network on behalf of Electricity North West until 2010, when Electricity North West bought the electricity network operations and maintenance arm from United Utilities to establish one Group.

In October 2011, United Utilities was selected as the preferred bidder by Severn Trent Water to purchase the Lake Vyrnwy estate for £11 million. United Utilities later withdrew from the bidding process. In February 2012, United Utilities proposed a national water pipeline linking water sources in Manchester to London. In April 2016, United Utilities received an 18-year loan of £500m from The European Investment Bank to support investment across the North West.

In May 2016, the Competition & Markets Authority granted United Utilities and Severn Trent Water approval to create a new joint venture company in preparation for the water market deregulation. In June 2016, United Utilities and Severn Trent Water formed Water Plus, in readiness to provide the retail services for their non-household customers.

In May 2019, the company announced the appointment of Sir David Higgins as a non-executive director and to succeed Dr John McAdam as chairman.

Operations

United Utilities currently supplies water to a population of 7.3 million people across the North West.

The company also manages 78,000 kilometres of wastewater pipes which take sewage from 7.3 million people for treatment at nearly 600 wastewater treatment works. It also operates 37 renewable energy facilities.

Reservoirs

United Utilities owns some 166 water supply reservoirs, various river and stream intakes, as well as lake abstractions and numerous groundwater sources, to supply the region. Some reservoirs operated by the company are outside the North West such as the Longdendale Chain in Derbyshire, which were constructed by the Manchester Corporation in the 19th century, and remain networked to the North West's water supply. The principal reservoirs are as follows:

Cumbria
Haweswater Reservoir
Thirlmere

Cheshire
Lamaload Reservoir
Macclesfield Forest

Derbyshire
Longdendale Chain
 Woodhead Reservoir
 Torside Reservoir
 Bottoms Reservoir
 Arnfield Reservoir
Hurst Reservoir
Bottoms Reservoir
Errwood Reservoir
Fernilee Reservoir

Greater Manchester
Belmont Reservoir
High Rid Reservoir
Rumworth Lodge Reservoir
Gorton Reservoirs
Heaton Park Reservoir
Dovestone Reservoir
Chew Reservoir
Greenfield Reservoir
Strinesdale Reservoir
Yeoman Hey Reservoir
Ashworth Moor Reservoir
Blackstone Edge Reservoir
Kitcliffe Reservoir
Norman Hill Reservoir
Ogden Reservoir
Piethorne Reservoir
Rooden Reservoir
Watergrove Reservoir
Audenshaw Reservoirs
Godley Reservoir
Worthington Lakes

Lancashire
The Rivington Chain.
Anglezarke Reservoir
Upper Rivington Reservoir
Lower Rivington Reservoir
Yarrow Reservoir
Upper Roddlesworth Reservoir
Lower Roddlesworth Reservoir
Rake Brook Reservoir
High Bullough Reservoir
Clowbridge
Cowm Reservoir
Haslingden Grane
Stocks Reservoir
Wayoh Reservoir

Service problems

Watermain breaks
In May 2010, a burst water main cut 15,000 customers in Moreton, Leasowe and Wallasey off water for 3 days.
In November 2019, a burst pipe in a local treatment works disrupted water supply in the CH 41/42/43/63 areas and bottled water supply points were set up.

Water contamination 
On 7 August 2015, cryptosporidium, a water borne parasite that can cause diarrhoea and vomiting, had been detected in the water supply to Blackpool, Chorley, Fylde, Preston, South Ribble and Wyre affecting more than 300,000 customers. No cases of cryptosporidiosis were reported and by introducing of ultra-violet treatment units "boil water" notices could be lifted in some areas. Initial Investigations by United Utilities and the Drinking Water Inspectorate had not identified the cause. Later the root cause was identified as run-off water from agricultural land following severe rainfall.

On 6 September 2015, the water supply was declared free from contamination, and restrictions were lifted. United Utilities was subsequently fined £300,000 at Preston Crown Court on 10 October 2017 for supplying water unfit for human consumption, with an additional £150,000 costs. It paid around £18 million in compensation to its customers. United Utilities held a number of seminars following this event to outline steps it had taken following the incident and share lessons with other water companies.

See also

Watermen: A Dirty Business, 2014 documentary television series following employees of United Utilities

References

External links

Yahoo profile

Water companies of England
Companies based in Warrington
Companies listed on the London Stock Exchange
Electric power distribution network operators in the United Kingdom
Companies formerly listed on the New York Stock Exchange
Dual-listed companies
1995 establishments in England